Living Single is an American television sitcom created by Yvette Lee Bowser that aired for five seasons on the Fox network from August 22, 1993, to January 1, 1998. The show centers on the lives of six New York City friends who share personal and professional experiences while living in a Brooklyn brownstone.

Episodes

Living Single centered on six people consisting of four women and two men living the single life in Prospect Heights, Brooklyn.

The series focused on two different households in one brownstone, one shared by a trio of independent women and another shared by two male friends who had known each other since childhood while living in Cleveland, Ohio. In the first apartment, Khadijah James (Queen Latifah), a hard-working editor and publisher of the fictional urban independent magazine Flavor, lived with her sweet but naive cousin Synclaire James (Kim Coles), an aspiring actress who worked as Khadijah's receptionist and had an affinity for Troll dolls, and her childhood friend from East Orange, New Jersey, Regina "Régine" Hunter (Kim Fields), an image-conscious boutique buyer who was on a constant search for a well-to-do man to spend her life (and his money) with. Later in the series, Régine became a costume assistant for the soap opera Palo Alto. When the soap was canceled, she became a wedding planner and left the apartment to move in with her fiancé Dexter Knight (Don Franklin). Maxine "Max" Shaw (Erika Alexander), a sharp-tongued  Attorney and Khadijah's best friend from their college days at Howard University, frequently stopped by to share her unique insights and the events of her day, to make sure that the girls' refrigerator wasn't overstocked, and to start trouble with Kyle, looking for any chance to make his life worse.

Kyle Barker (T.C. Carson) lived in the second apartment with Overton Wakefield Jones (John Henton). Overton was the friendly but bucolic maintenance man for the owner of their (and neighboring) building, who held a deep affection for Synclaire and plenty of hilarious homespun wisdom for everyone else. Kyle was a stockbroker whose constant verbal sparring with Max did little to mask their obvious sexual attraction to each other. Kyle and Max pursued a sexual relationship, but when he decided to take a job in London and invited Max to join him, she turned him down. Maxine subsequently became distraught over her decision and, after defending a man who claimed to be the second coming of Jesus (Harold Perrineau), she began to take her life more seriously. Through a series of events, Max decided that her purpose must be to become a mother. During the insemination process, she unknowingly picked Kyle's sperm specimen based on a list of qualities she would like for her child to have. Kyle returned in the series finale, and the two reconciled. Overton and Synclaire also got together, and their relationship culminated in marriage by the end of the fourth season. In season five, they moved in together, leaving Overton and Kyle's apartment open for new character Roni DeSantos (Idalis DeLeon), a New York-area D.J., to move in. It was eventually revealed that DeSantos had a fling with Ira Lee "Tripp" Williams III, (Mel Jackson), a songwriter whom Khadijah and Régine allowed to move in when Synclaire's room became available. Synclaire joined a comedy improv troupe where she gained the attention of Tony Jonas, a Warner Bros. Television executive who cast her as a nun for a new comedy series he was developing.

Along with trying to make Flavor a success, Khadijah also looked for Mr. Right. She eventually found him in childhood friend Scooter (Cress Williams), with whom she left the brownstone for the final time in the series finale.

Cast and characters

Regular cast
Queen Latifah – Khadijah James, Howard graduate and editor and publisher of Flavor Magazine, an independent magazine devoted to the interests of the African-American community.
Kim Fields – Regina "Regine" Hunter (Episodes 1–115), Khadijah and Synclaire's gossip-loving roommate; Khadijah's childhood friend.
Kim Coles – Synclaire James-Jones, Khadijah's good-natured cousin and roommate; receptionist at Flavor and aspiring actress. The role of Synclaire was originally intended for Queen Latifah's long-time friend and collaborator, Monie Love, but she was unable to take the part.
Erika Alexander – Maxine "Max" Felice Shaw, strong-willed  Attorney, Khadijah's best friend and former college roommate at Howard, who grew up in Mount Airy, Philadelphia; spends most of her time at the women's apartment.
T.C. Carson – Kyle Barker (Episodes 1–107; guest appearance in episode 118), stockbroker and Overton's roommate; Max's verbal sparring partner and on-again-off-again love interest.
John Henton – Overton "Obie" Wakefield Jones, Kyle's roommate and the brownstone's handyman; Synclaire's sweetheart, also co-owner of the apartment complex the gang lived in. 
Mel Jackson – Ira Lee "Tripp" Williams (Season 5), Khadijah and Regine's new roommate; aspiring songwriter.

Recurring cast
 Chip Fields — Laverne Hunter, Regine's mother
 Rita Owens — Rita James (Season 1–4), Khadijah's mother
 Michael Warren — Ed James (Season 4), Khadijah's father
 Barbara Montgomery – Nana James (Season 2), Khadijah's grandmother
 Khalil Kain — Keith (Season 3–4), Regine's boyfriend and artist
 Don Franklin — Dexter Knight (Season 5), Regine's boyfriend turned fiancé
 Cress Williams — Terrence "Scooter" Williams, Khadijah's childhood friend and boyfriend
 Isaiah Washington — Dr. Charles Roberts (Season 4), Khadijah's anesthesiologist and boyfriend 
 Heavy D - Darryl, Regine's boyfriend (3 episodes)
 Shaun Baker — Russell Montego, Jamaican-born music editor at Flavor, in love with Regine.
 Bumper Robinson — Ivan Ennis (Season 3–4), Flavor copy aide and journalism major at New York University, in love with Khadijah.
 Idalis DeLeon — Roni DeSantos (Season 5), popular New York City deejay and Tripp's love interest

Guest cast
 Cylk Cozart – Brad Hamilton, Regine's boyfriend who turned out to be married (Season 1, Episode 1) 
 Freda Payne – Miss Harper (Season 1, Episode 2) 
 Thomas Mikal Ford – Michael Edwards, Synclaire's date (Season 1, Episode 3)
 Jeffrey D. Sams – Greg, Maxine's ex-boyfriend (Season 1, Episode 4)
 Kellita Smith - Susan, Greg's fiancée (Season 1, Episode 4)
 Miguel A. Nunez – Goldie (Season 1, Episode 6 & 20) 
 Montrose Hagins – Shirley Shortridge (Season 1, Episode 7) 
 Marcus Giamatti – Jack Peabody (Season 1, Episode 7)
 Dominic Hoffman – Patrick (Season 1, Episode 8)
 Isabel Sanford – Mrs. Ryan (Season 1, Episode 10)
 Ed McMahon – as himself (Season 1, Episode 12) 
 Flip Wilson - as himself (Season 1, Episode 12)
 Dres (rapper) – as himself (Season 1, Episode 12)
 Nia Long – Stacey Evans, photographer for Flavor and Kyle's date (Season 1, Episode 13)
 Terrence Howard – Brendan King, Maxine's college-aged boyfriend (Season 1, Episode 17) 
 Cree Summer – Summer, Overton's date (Season 1, Episode 18)
 Kelvin Mercer - Morris King, (Season 1, Episode 18)
 Morris Chestnut – Hamilton Brown, the new upstairs neighbor (Season 1, Episode 18)
 Michael Jai White – Steve (Season 1, Episode 20)
 Charnele Brown – Jackie, Khadijah's college friend (Season 1, Episode 21) 
 Arsenio Hall – as himself (Season 1, Episode 21)
 Mark Curry – Tony Ross, Regine's boyfriend, a standup comedian (Season 1, Episode 25)
 Adam Lazarre-White - Alonzo Ford (Season 1, Episode 24 and 27)
 Cheryl Miller – Denise Hatcher, Khadijah's school basketball rival (Season 2, Episode 2)
 Branford Marsalis – as himself (Season 2, Episode 2)
 Tamlyn Tomita – Mary, business client of Flavor (Season 2, Episode 5)
 Franklin Cover – Professor Fletcher, Synclaire's teacher (Season 2, Episode 6)
 Michole Briana White — Olivia Imogen Jones (Season 2 Episode 7 & Season 4 Episode 24), Overton's sister
 Gilbert Gottfried – Lawrence J. Friedlander, telemarketing company owner (Season 2, Episode 10)
 Wayne Federman – Fred Meyer, Maxine's public defender (Season 2, Episode 10)
 Diana Bellamy – Judge Glazer, the judge at Maxine's trial (Season 2, Episode 10)
 Elayne Boosler – Dr. Sheridan, Regine's doctor (Season 2, Episode 11)
 John Capodice – neighborhood ice cream man (Season 2, Episode 11)
 Deion Sanders – as himself (Season 2, Episode 12)
 Rosie O'Donnell – Sheri, Khadijah's high school friend (Season 2, Episode 14)
 Bobby Bonilla – as himself (Season 2, Episode 16)
 Shemar Moore – Jon Marc, Synclaire's study partner (Season 2, Episode 18)
 Phil Morris – Preston August, Maxine's boss and former boyfriend (Season 2, Episode 19)
 Phil LaMarr – Joe, friend of Regine's boyfriend (Season 2, Episode 19)
 Vanessa A. Williams – Hellura, Kyle's date (Season 2, Episode 22)
 Kadeem Hardison – Marcus Hughes, Village Voice reporter (Season 2, Episode 23)
 Roberto Durán – as himself (Season 2, Episode 23) 
 Jenifer Lewis – Delia Deveaux, talk show host (Season 2, Episode 25)
 Will Ferrell – talk show guest (Season 2, Episode 25)
 Q-Tip (musician) - Roberto Hughes (Season 2, Episode 26)
 Bill Erwin – Mr. Foster, store owner (Season 2, Episode 26)
 Regina King – Zina, possible new roommate (Season 2, Episode 26)
 Tatyana Ali – Stephanie James (Season 3), Khadijah's half-sister
 CCH Pounder – Nina Shaw (Season 3), Maxine's mother
 Gladys Knight — Odelle Jones (Season 4), Overton's mother
 Antonio Fargas — Otis Jones (Season 4), Overton's father
 Denise Nicholas — Lilah James (Season 4), Synclaire's mother
 Ron O'Neal — Clinton James (Season 4), Synclaire's father
 Kenny Blank - as Damon Barker  (Season 4), Kyle's brother. 
 Dorien Wilson — Rev. Leslie Taylor (Season 3–4), pastor at the group's church
 Grant Hill – as himself (Season 3, Episode 3)
 John O'Hurley – as Jean Luc Gerard, Regine new boss (Season 3, Episode 5)
 Eartha Kitt – as Jacqueline Richards, Kyle's client (Season 3, Episode 8)
 Alonzo Mourning – as himself (Season 3, Episode 10)
 Burt Ward – as himself (Season 3, Episode 11)
 Dean Cain – as himself (Season 3, Episode 11)
 Cris Carter – as himself (Season 3, Episode 12)
 Michael Boatman – as Brent, Palo Alto Actor (Season 3, Episode 13)
 Dorian Gregory – as Mountie Robeson (Season 3, Episode 13)
 Melvin Van Peebles – Warner Devant, Regine's date (Season 3, Episode 16)
 Mario Van Peebles – Cole Front, Regine's date (Season 3, Episode 16)
 Brian McKnight – as himself (Season 3, Episode 17)
 Jasmine Guy – Dr. Jessica Bryce, Khadijah's therapist (Season 3, Episode 19)
 Monica – Marissa, Khadijah's date's sister (Season 3, Episode 24)
 Giancarlo Esposito – Maxine's client (Season 3, Episode 24)
 Jack Carter – Ray Kellum, eccentric man (Season 3, Episode 26; Season 4, Episode 9)
 Bobcat Goldthwait – mugger (Season 3, Episode 27; Season 4, Episode 1)
 Tone Loc – as Lester Tate, picked on Kyle in high school (Season 4, Episode 8)
 Vivica A. Fox – as Darryl's fiancée (Season 4, Episode 9)
 Jeff Blake – as himself (Season 4, Episode 10)
 Sullivan Walker – as Dr. Booker Burghardt Mountebank (Season 4, Episode 12)
 Evander Holyfield – as himself (Season 4, Episode 15)
 Kareem Abdul-Jabbar – as himself (Season 4, Episode 15)
 Susan L. Taylor – as herself (Season 4, Episode 15)
 Estelle Harris – as Esther Brooks, owner of the brownstone (Season 4, Episode 15)
 CeCe Winans – as LaTrice, in the choir of the group's church (Season 4, Episode 16)
 Sherri Shepherd – comedian (Season 4, Episode 17)
 Joseph Marcell — Reese, the women's house cleaner (Season 4, Episode 19)
 Jim Brown – as himself (Season 4, Episode 20)
 Kenya Moore – as Lisa DeLongPre, Kyle's Date (Season 4, Episode 21)
 Tracy Vilar – as Ava Rivera (Season 4, Episode 22)
 Desmond Howard – as himself (Season 4, Episode 24)
 Marsha Warfield – Agnes Finch, cruise social director (Season 5, Episodes 1 and 2)
 Montell Jordan – as himself (Season 5, Episode 2)
 Vincent Mason - as Christopher Thompson (Season 5, Episode 3)
 Cedric Ceballos – as himself (Season 5, Episode 3)
 Chaka Khan – as herself (Season 5, Episode 6)
 Keyshawn Johnson – as himself (Season 5, Episode 7)
 Tionne 'T-Boz' Watkins – hitchhiker (Season 5, Episode 8)
 Harold Perrineau – Walter Jackson, Maxine's client (Season 5, Episode 9)
 Joyce DeWitt – as herself (Season 5, Episode 12)
 DJ Premier as Keyshawn King (Season 5, Episodes 9 and 12)

Home media
Warner Home Video released the complete first season of Living Single on DVD in Region 1 on February 14, 2006.
The entire series is also available for digital download on Amazon.com and the iTunes Store.

Warner Archive subsequently released seasons 2–5 on DVD in Region 1. These are Manufacture-on-Demand (MOD) releases, available from Warner's online store and Amazon.com.

Production
Queen Latifah and Kim Coles both had development deals with Fox. In March 1993, Fox announced that Queen Latifah and Coles would star in a comedy sitcom called My Girls, about roommates in New York City. The character of Khadijah was created for Queen Latifah. Khadijah is an entrepreneur who started an urban-lifestyle magazine, much as Latifah is an entrepreneur who started her hip-hop record label. Fox changed the show's name to Living Single three weeks before its television debut.

Creator Yvette Lee Bowser's initial goal was to develop a show about herself and her friends that would change the portrayal of young Black people on television. Her overall goal was to portray Black characters positively and less stereotypical. She also noted that the women represented on Living Single are four different sides of herself, saying in an interview, "I've been as ditsy as Synclaire, as superficial as Regine, as bitter as Max, and as focused and driven as Khadijah."

In May 1997, Fox announced that it had ordered 13 episodes of the fifth season of Living Single but would be delayed until January 1998. Three months later, Fox made a change to its fall schedule, delayed the airing of a new comedy called Rewind, and decided to debut Living Singles fifth season on September 11. The final episode of the fifth season aired on January 1, 1998.

Crossovers
The Crew: In one episode "The Mating Season" of the short-lived Fox sitcom The Crew, Regine becomes a passenger on a flight and argues with a sassy stewardess in hopes of upgrading to first class. In another episode, "The Worst Noel," Synclaire also becomes a passenger. The episode served as a bridge for The Crew and its lead-in show, Living Single.

Half & Half: Erika Alexander and T.C. Carson reprised their roles of Maxine Shaw and Kyle Barker on the UPN sitcom, Half & Half (a series produced by Living Single creator Yvette Lee Bowser). In the episode ("The Big Performance Anxiety Episode," third season), ambitious law student Dee Dee learns that her mother's co-star in a play is engaged to Maxine, Dee Dee's idol. However, her mother gets Maxine's beau, Kyle, fired because she fears he will take attention away from her. The episode also revealed that Maxine and Kyle remained a couple and were the proud parents of their seven-year-old daughter named Kyla.

Syndication
Living Single started reruns in syndication on September 22, 1997, through various Fox, UPN, and WB affiliates; these were later CW affiliates in terms of UPN and WB. The series formerly reran on USA Network, Logo TV, BET, and Oxygen. Syndication carriage on the local level fizzled out in 2006. Reruns of the series currently run daily on cable networks TV One, MTV2, Bounce TV, WCIU and VH1. As of January 11, 2018, all episodes began streaming on Hulu, and on HBO Max as of September 22, 2022.

Reunion specials
An hour-long retrospective special, Living Single: The Reunion Show, aired on TV One on September 22, 2008. Coles, Henton, Fields, Carson and Alexander reunited to share fond memories with the fans. Queen Latifah and Mel Jackson were unavailable to participate. The special featured clips and revealing secrets of the cast from the show's five-year run.

From August 24 to 26, 2018, TV One aired a weekend marathon of "Living Single" to highlight the 25th anniversary of the show. Coles, Henton, Fields, and Carson reunited once again to share memories with the fans, to share their thoughts on the characters they portrayed and provided a tribute to Rita Owens (Queen Latifah's real-life and TV mother), who had passed in early 2018. Queen Latifah, Erika Alexander and Mel Jackson were unavailable to participate.

Reception 
During Living Singles first season, it consistently garnered higher ratings than Martin, which aired in the time slot immediately before it on Thursday nights, and it quickly became the fourth highest-rated show aired on Fox.

Throughout its run, Living Single became one of the most popular African-American sitcoms of its era, ranking among the top five in African-American ratings in all five seasons. Newspaper critics contrasted Living Single with the NBC sitcom Friends which was inspired by the former. Living Single featured successful Black characters including an attorney, a stockbroker, and a business owner, in contrast to Friends, which featured white characters including a waitress, a folk singer, and an unemployed actor. Show creator Yvette Lee Bowser was disappointed that Warner Bros. did not promote Living Single nearly as much as it did Friends.

Living Single was never one of the highest-rated programs among audiences during its run from 1993 to 1998. Indeed, the show had struggled to break into lists of top television programs viewed by larger audiences and never broke into the Top 50, though it was a higher performer for the Fox network itself. Those who loved and watched the show regularly have told show creator Yvette Lee Bowser that they connect with its characters, love the cast, and are inspired by the positive, elegant, and professional portrayal of Black people on television. Bowser noted that "People say our characters remind them of themselves, their friends or their relatives. They all know someone like one of the characters."

Awards and nominations

In 1995 and 1996, Living Single was nominated for Primetime Emmy Awards for Outstanding Lighting Direction (Electronic) for a Comedy Series (Bryan Hays).

References

External links
 (archived)

1993 American television series debuts
1998 American television series endings
1990s American black sitcoms
1990s American romantic comedy television series
English-language television shows
Fox Broadcasting Company original programming
Television series by Warner Bros. Television Studios
Television shows filmed in California
Television shows set in Brooklyn